The Challenge Vuelta Ciclista a Mallorca is a series of four (five until 2012) professional one day road bicycle races held on the Spanish island of Mallorca in late January or early February. The event is used as an early season preparatory event by many of the top teams in readiness for the bigger races later in the season. The five races are ranked 1.1 on the UCI Europe Tour.

Although the race styles itself as the "Tour of Majorca" it has never been allowed to be classed as a multi day stage race by the sports governing body the Union Cycliste Internationale (UCI) because the race rules allows riders not to participate on certain days. However, there is an unofficial overall classification winner taken on total time over five days. This laid back attitude by the race organisers makes the race popular with team managers who can bring a large squad (sometimes as many as 20 riders) and interchange them over the five days. Apart from the overall classification. there are the usual Mountains, Points and Sprints competitions associated with any stage race. There is also a competition for the top Majorcan based rider; in the past this has been won by Vicente Reynès, Antonio Colóm and Antonio Tauler.

The first day of racing is the Trofeo Mallorca, a criterium around the streets of Palma. The second day is the Trofeo Cala Millor, sometimes called the Trofeo Alcúdia. These two opening days are run over a fairly flat course and result in a sprint finish. The Trofeo Pollença (day three) and Trofeo Sóller (day four) are contested over a more hilly course using the climbs of the Col de Sóller (501 metres) and the Col de Puig Major (850 metres) amongst others on the route. These two hilly days usually decide the outcome of the unofficial overall classification over the five days. The final days racing is the Trofeo Calvià which takes place on an undulating course over a series of small climbs.

Top class riders such as Laurent Jalabert, Alex Zülle and Alejandro Valverde have won the overall classification at the Vuelta a Mallorca; Spanish rider Francesco Cabello, who rode for the Kelme team throughout his career, holds the record for the most victories, taking three overall victories in Majorca in 1996, 2000 and 2002. In 2004 Colóm became the first rider who was a native of the island of Majorca to take the overall classification.

The Vuelta a Mallorca receives heavy sponsorship from Tourism section of the local Majorcan government (Govern de la Illes Balears). The race was first held in 1992 and for the first three years was just open to Spanish teams, however in 1995 foreign squads were invited for the first time with teams such as Telekom and TVM attending. In 1998 Léon van Bon of the Dutch Rabobank squad became the first overall winner riding for a non Spanish team.

General Classification Winners

Individual Race Winners

Notes

External links

Mallorca
UCI Europe Tour races
Recurring sporting events established in 1992
1992 establishments in Spain
Sport in Mallorca